The year 1937 in architecture involved some significant architectural events and new buildings.

Events
 May – The Georgian Group is set up as part of the Society for the Protection of Ancient Buildings in England.
 September 7 – Witley Court in Worcestershire, England, is gutted by fire.
 J. M. Richards becomes editor of the Architectural Review (London), continuing until 1971.
 Icelandic State Architect Guðjón Samúelsson's design for the Hallgrímskirkja in Reykjavík is commissioned; it will be constructed 1945–86.

Buildings and structures

Buildings opened

 May 6 – Chelsea Bridge in Pimlico, London, designed by G. Topham Forrest, former head of London County Council's Architect's Department, opened by the Prime Minister of Canada, William Lyon Mackenzie King.
 May 27 – The Golden Gate Bridge in San Francisco, longest suspension bridge in the world by the length of central span (1937–1964), designed by Joseph B. Strauss.
 July 18 – Haus der deutschen Kunst ("House of German Art") in Munich, designed by Paul Troost (died 1934), opened by Adolf Hitler to display art of the Third Reich.

Buildings completed

 Thousand Islands Bridge over the Saint Lawrence River, linking Canada and the United States.
 Petőfi Bridge, Budapest, Hungary.
 Holy Trinity Church, Sighișoara, Romania, designed by Dumitru Petrescu Gopeş.
 Bethlehem Church, Copenhagen, Denmark, by Kaare Klint after original designs by his father, Peder Vilhelm Jensen-Klint (died 1930).
 Church of St Michael and All Angels, Northenden, Manchester, England, designed by Nugent Cachemaille-Day.
 Church of Our Lady Star of the Sea and St Winefride, Amlwch, Wales, designed by Giuseppe Rinvolucri.
 Senate House (University of London), designed by Charles Holden.
 Dolphin Square in Pimlico, London, designed by Gordon Jeeves.
 Villa Myrdal, designed by Sven Markelius.
 3 Mapu Street, White City (Tel Aviv), Mandatory Palestine, designed by Ben-Ami Shulman.
 St Ann's Court, near Chertsey in England, a modernist circular house designed by Raymond McGrath for Gerald L. Schlesinger and his partner landscape architect Christopher Tunnard.
 Houses in Frognal Close, Hampstead, London, designed by Ernst L. Freud.
 Kensal House in Ladbroke Grove, London, two low-rise blocks of modernist flats for the working class designed by Maxwell Fry.
 Republic pavilion, Barcelona, and Spanish Republican government pavilion at the Exposition Internationale des Arts et Techniques dans la Vie Moderne in Paris, both designed by Josep Lluís Sert.
 Club Moderne, Anaconda, Montana, designed by Fred F. Willson, built.
 Via della Conciliazione in Rome constructed following demolition of the Piazza Scossacavalli.

Awards
 RIBA Royal Gold Medal – Raymond Unwin.
 Grand Prix de Rome, architecture: Paul Jacques Grillo

Births

 February 7 – Daryl Jackson, Australian architect
 April 18 – Jan Kaplický, Czech architect mainly active in UK (died 2009)
 May 9 – Rafael Moneo, Spanish architect
 September 14 – Renzo Piano, Italian Pritzker Prize-winning architect
 October 3 – Richard England, Maltese architect
 October 24 – M. Rosaria Piomelli, born Agrisano, Italian-born American architect
 date unknown
 Kate Macintosh, Scottish-born architect
 Georgie Wolton, born Cheesman, English architect
 Yoshio Taniguchi, Japanese architect active in New York

Deaths
 January 10 – Bertie Crewe, English architect (born 1860)
 January 28 – Anastasios Metaxas, Greek architect and shooting champion (born 1862)
 February 11 – Walter Burley Griffin, US architect and landscape architect, involved in design of Canberra (born 1876)
 May 9 – Harry Barton, US architect from North Carolina (born 1876)
 August 27 – John Russell Pope, US architect known for his work in Washington, DC (born 1874)
 November 23 – Edward Prioleau Warren, English architect (born 1856)

References